KDMT (1690 AM) is a radio station licensed to Arvada, Colorado, and serving the Denver-Boulder radio market. The station is owned by Relevant Radio, Inc., and broadcasts a Catholic talk format, as an affiliate of Relevant Radio.

History
KDMT originated as the expanded band "twin" of an existing station on the standard AM band. On March 17, 1997 the FCC announced that eighty-eight stations had been given permission to move to newly available "Expanded Band" transmitting frequencies, ranging from 1610 to 1700 kHz, with then-KQXI in Arvada authorized to move from 1550 to 1690 kHz. A Construction Permit for the expanded band station was assigned the call letters KAYK on November 10, 1997.

In June 1998, Radio Property Ventures sold the KAYK construction permit for 1690 AM and KQXI on 1550 AM for $3.5 million to ABC, Inc., at a time when the company was buying stations for the Radio Disney network. KAYK began operations on the 3rd of that month, and the simulcasting by 1550 AM and 1690 AM began carrying Radio Disney programming. After the sale closed late in 1998, the stations took on new Disney-inspired call letters on December 11, 1998, as 1690 AM changed to KADZ while1550 AM became KDDZ. On January 15, 1999, these call letters were swapped, with 1690 AM becoming KDDZ and 1550 AM changing to KADZ.

The FCC's initial policy for expanded band assignments was that both the original station and its expanded band counterpart could operate simultaneously for up to five years, after which owners would have to turn in one of the two licenses, depending on whether they preferred the new assignment or elected to remain on the original frequency. ABC chose to retain the expanded band frequency, and KADZ on 1550 AM was formally deleted by the FCC on November 18, 2003. 

On August 13, 2014, The Walt Disney Company put KDDZ and twenty-two other Radio Disney stations up for sale, in order to focus more on digital distribution of the Radio Disney network.

On September 15, 2015, it was announced that the Salem Media Group had acquired the last five Radio Disney owned-and-operated stations for sale (including KDDZ) for $2.225 million. KDDZ was acquired through Salem Media of Colorado, Inc., for $550,000. According to Radio Insight, KDDZ would become Salem's Wall Street Business Network affiliate in Denver. The sale was completed on December 8, 2015. The call sign was changed to KDMT. On December 17, 2015, the station began stunting with music by Johnny Cash as "Cash Country 1690". The stunt led into the February 1, 2016 launch of "Money Talk 1690."

On November 14, 2019, the station was sold to Immaculate Heart Media, Inc., and it became an affiliate of Relevant Radio.

Former logos

References

External links 

DMT (AM)
Arvada, Colorado
Relevant Radio stations
Former subsidiaries of The Walt Disney Company
DMT (AM)